Octopus vitiensis (commonly the bighead octopus) is a species of octopus provisionally placed in the genus Octopus. It was described by William Evans Hoyle in 1885 based on a specimen found in reefs in Kandavu, Fiji.

Description 
O. vitiensis is maroon to dark purple-black in color. It has large eyes, a broad head, and arms of moderate length. The species is described as robust and muscular. O. vitiensis is small, and has a mantle length of up to 60 millimeters and a total length of up to 250 millimeters.

Distribution 
O. vitiensis is found in Fiji, Tonga, and Papua New Guinea, at depths of zero to 20 meters.

Life cycle 
O. vitiensis lays eggs two millimeters in length.

References 

Octopodidae
Molluscs described in 1885